Oluwaferanmi Joshua Chibuzo Oluwayemi (born 13 March 2001) is an English professional footballer who plays as a goalkeeper for EFL League One club Portsmouth.

Club career
Born in Waltham Forest, Oluwayemi joined Tottenham Hotspur's academy at the age of 10, subsequently coming through the club's youth ranks.

In October 2020, he started his senior career by moving on loan to National League club Maidenhead United until January 2021. In the summer of 2022, he was released by Tottenham, without having made any appearances for the Spurs.

Following a successful trial at Portsmouth, on 19 July 2022 Oluwayemi joined the EFL League One club on a permanent deal, signing a one-year contract, with an option for another season. He made his league debut for Pompey on 14 January 2023, starting in a 3–0 away loss against Bolton Wanderers.

International career
Thanks to his dual citizenship, Oluwayemi can choose to represent either England or Nigeria internationally.

Oluwayemi has represented England at under-15 and under-16 level.

In July 2021, Oluwayemi was called up to the senior Nigeria side for a friendly against Mexico.

Personal life 
Oluwayemi has a younger brother, Tobi (b. 2003), who also plays as a goalkeeper: he similarly played for Tottenham's youth academy, before joining Celtic in the summer of 2019, and represented England at various youth international levels.

Career statistics

References

2001 births
Living people
English footballers
Tottenham Hotspur F.C. players
Maidenhead United F.C. players
Portsmouth F.C. players
Association football goalkeepers
England youth international footballers
English people of Nigerian descent
Black British sportspeople
English Football League players